Hojjatol-Islam Mousa Qorbani is a Conservative Islamic  mullah who serves (as of 2007) as the presiding board member in the Islamic Consultative Assembly in the Islamic Republic of Iran. He is elected by people of Qaen (in Southern Khorasan) as the member of parliament.

External links
Iran fingerprints U.S. visitors
MP: "Iran is the final winner"

Iranian Shia clerics
Iranian Islamists
Shia Islamists
Living people
Year of birth missing (living people)
Members of the 5th Islamic Consultative Assembly
Members of the 6th Islamic Consultative Assembly
Members of the 7th Islamic Consultative Assembly
Members of the 8th Islamic Consultative Assembly